Borja Valero Iglesias (born 12 January 1985) is a Spanish professional footballer who plays as a midfielder. 

He began his career with Real Madrid but did not have any impact with its first team, and played for Mallorca and in England for West Bromwich Albion before joining Villarreal in 2010. He also spent nine years in the Italian Serie A, with Fiorentina and Inter Milan.

Over five seasons, Valero amassed La Liga totals of 139 games and 16 goals. He made one appearance for the Spain national team.

Club career

Real Madrid
Valero was born in Madrid, and began his football career as a youngster in the ranks of Real Madrid. He made his first appearance for the reserve side in Segunda División B as a second-half substitute, took part in the playoffs to earn promotion and played two full seasons in Segunda División.

Valero played only twice for the first team: given his debut by Fabio Capello against Écija on 25 October 2006, replacing Javi García after 60 minutes of a match for the Copa del Rey, he also featured once in the UEFA Champions League, substituting Miguel Ángel Nieto in a 2–2 away draw with Dynamo Kyiv in the group stage.

Mallorca
In August 2007, Valero signed a five-year contract with Mallorca following his release from Real Madrid. He scored his first La Liga goals in a 7–1 home win over Recreativo on 9 March 2008, and added another a month later, against his former team in a 1–1 home draw.

Valero scored the first goal on 11 May 2008, as his side came back from 2–0 down to beat Barcelona in Frank Rijkaard's last home game as the latter's manager. He made 17 starts and played a total of 1,892 minutes during the season, helping to a seventh-place finish.

In mid-August 2008, Mallorca's president stated that he had rejected bids from West Bromwich Albion for Valero and Óscar Trejo, but a week later, the former signed for the latter – newly promoted to the Premier League – for a club record fee of €7 million (£4.7 million). He agreed a four-year contract, with the option of a further year.

West Bromwich Albion
Valero made his debut four days later in Albion's 1–3 League Cup defeat away to Hartlepool United. Manager Tony Mowbray said that he would have benefited from his first game in English football, only hours after receiving international clearance, despite the defeat.

Following the team's relegation to the Championship after just one season, Valero said that he intended to remain at the club: "I still have a three-year contract here and would like to be true to that. For sure playing in the second division is not ideal. But if I have to put up with it then I am going to put up with it." By the beginning of the next campaign, however, he had changed his mind: "I prefer to play in Mallorca and not to be in the second division in England. This is clear. I am disposed for a loan return but it is necessary for an accord between the clubs".

Just hours before the close of the transfer window, Valero returned to Mallorca on loan for 2009–10. On 13 September, in the first match in his second spell, he scored their 1000th top level goal in a 1–1 draw at Villarreal. In another away fixture, he netted in the last minute for the nine-man side to clinch a 1–1 draw against Atlético Madrid in October, and was ever-present as they finished fifth and qualified for the UEFA Europa League; he also won the prestigious Don Balón Award for the best Spanish player in the Spanish League.

At the end of the campaign, Valero returned to his parent club after Mallorca confirmed they could not afford to take up the agreed fee of £2.5 million to make the move permanent.

Villarreal
For 2010–11, it was reported that Valero was joining Villarreal on a five-year contract, but the clubs eventually agreed on a season-long loan, with the move to be made permanent at the end of the campaign. He scored on his home debut, a 4–0 win against Espanyol on 12 September 2010, and featured heavily throughout the season as the team finished in fourth position and qualified for the Champions League.

On 1 July 2011, Villarreal signed Valero on a permanent basis for an undisclosed fee. The former were relegated at the end of the campaign, and it was reported that he was among a number of players expected to leave.

Fiorentina
On 1 August 2012, Fiorentina agreed with Villarreal for the transfer of Valero. The move was confirmed three days later, and he joined the Serie A side alongside teammate Gonzalo Rodríguez; after joining, he said leaving his previous club was not easy and that he still had not come to terms with its relegation.

Valero made an immediate impact at the Viola, scoring five league goals in 37 games in his first season and providing 11 assists as the team qualified to the Europa League. He scored his first goal in 2013–14 on 15 September in a 1–1 home draw against Cagliari, and, on 2 November, contributed to a 2–0 success at Milan; subsequently, he was named in Goal.com's Serie A Team of the Season.

On 15 July 2014, Valero signed a new deal at the Stadio Artemio Franchi until June 2019.

Inter Milan
On 10 July 2017, Valero transferred to Inter Milan on a three-year contract. He scored his first goal for his new club on 30 October, in a 2–1 away win against Hellas Verona.

Valero scored twice from 19 appearances in the 2019–20 campaign for the runners-up.

Later years
On 16 September 2020, aged 35, Valero returned to Fiorentina. On 30 June 2021, he announced his retirement from professional football, but on 19 August confirmed to have agreed to join Florence-based fan-owned Promozione amateur club Centro Storico Lebowski.

International career
Valero represented the Spain under-19 team at the 2004 European championships. In the final against Turkey he entered the match as an 85th-minute substitute and, two minutes into stoppage time, scored the only goal of the game.

On 4 June 2011, Valero made his debut for the full side, against the United States in Foxborough, Massachusetts. He replaced David Silva in the second half, and assisted Fernando Torres in the last goal.

Style of play
Primarily a central midfielder, Valero is a talented and creative playmaker, who is best known for his positional sense, vision, technique and passing ability, as well as his leadership, despite his lack of pace. A versatile player, he is also capable of playing as a deep-lying playmaker in front of the defence, as an attacking midfielder or even as an offensive-minded central midfielder, known as the "mezzala" role in Italian football jargon.

Career statistics

Club

1In West Bromwich Albion, includes FA Cup and Football League Cup.

International

Honours
Fiorentina
Coppa Italia runner-up: 2013–14

Inter Milan
UEFA Europa League runner-up: 2019–20

Spain U-19
UEFA European Under-19 Championship: 2004

Individual
Spanish Player of the Year: 2010
Serie A Team of the Year: 2012–13
UEFA Europa League Squad of the Season: 2013–14, 2014–15

References

External links

1985 births
Living people
Footballers from Madrid
Spanish footballers
Association football midfielders
La Liga players
Segunda División players
Segunda División B players
Real Madrid C footballers
Real Madrid Castilla footballers
Real Madrid CF players
RCD Mallorca players
Villarreal CF players
Premier League players
English Football League players
West Bromwich Albion F.C. players
Serie A players
Promozione players
ACF Fiorentina players
Inter Milan players
Spain youth international footballers
Spain international footballers
Spanish expatriate footballers
Expatriate footballers in England
Expatriate footballers in Italy
Spanish expatriate sportspeople in England
Spanish expatriate sportspeople in Italy